Edward Porter may refer to:

Edward F. Porter (1858–1915), American politician
Edward Guss Porter (1859–1929), Canadian politician
Edward Porter (Labour politician) (1880–1960), British Labour Party Member of Parliament for Warrington 1945–1950
Ned Porter, Irish hurler
Edward Porter (cricketer) (1846–1918), English cricketer
Edward S. Porter (1848–1902), physician in Louisville, Kentucky